Oliver Whateley (8 August 1861 – October 1926) was an English international footballer, who played as an inside forward.

Career
Born in Birmingham, Whateley played for Aston Villa, and earned two caps for England in 1883.

References

1861 births
1926 deaths
English footballers
England international footballers
Aston Villa F.C. players
English Football League players
Association football inside forwards